Jani Virk (born 4 March 1962) is a Slovene writer, poet, translator and editor. He writes poetry, short stories, essays, novels and scripts and translates from German into Slovene.

Virk was born in Ljubljana in 1962. He studied at the German and Comparative literature at the University of Ljubljana. During his studies, he worked in Chicago, London and Germany as a manual worker. In his youth, he trained for the Yugoslavian National Ski Team and he briefly worked as a ski coach. Later, he worked as an editor at the Literatura literary journal, the newspaper Slovenec and at the national broadcasting house. From 2010, he is the editor of the Drama department at RTV Slovenia.

In 1999 he won the Prešeren Foundation Award for his collection of short stories Pogled na Tycho Brache
(A View of Tycho Brahe). In 2014, he completed a Doctorate Degree in German studies, where he researched the theme of the Middles Ages in film and literature.

Published works

Short Stories 
 Preskok (The Jump Over), 1987
 Vrata in druge zgodbe (The Door and Other Stories), 1991
 Moški nad prepadom (Man Above the Abyss), 1994
 Izza potresa:novele (From Behind the Earthquake), 1995 (with Lela B. Njatin and Jože Hudeček) 
 Pogled na Tycho Brache (A View of Tycho Brahe), 1998
 Med drevesi (Among the Trees), 2016

Poetry 
 Tečeva čez polje (We Run Across the Field), 1990

Essay Collection  
 Na robu resničnosti (On the Edge of Reality), 1992

Novels 
 Rahela (Rachel), 1989
 1895, potres:kronika nenadejane ljubezni (1895, Earthquake: A Chronicle of an Unexpected Love), 1995
 Zadnja Sergijeva skušnjava (Sergij's Final Temptation), 1996
 Smeh za leseno pregrado (Laughter From Beyond the Wooden Barrier), 2000
 Aritmija (Arrhythmia), 2004
 Ljubezen v zrakvvu (Love in the Air), 2009
 Kar je odnesla rekla, kar je odnesel dim (What the River Swept Away, What Was Carried Away by Smoke), 2012
 Brez imena (No Name), 2018
 Jaka in Vane, zgodba iz osemdesetih (Jaka and Vane, A Story From the Eighties), 2021

For Young Readers 
 Regata (Regata), 1995 (in Bosnian, translated by Josip Osti)
 Poletje na snegu (Summer on the Snow), 2003
Awards

 Lake Balaton TV festival, Best script, Vaški učitelj, 1995
 Prix Europa, Best script nomination for Vaški učitelj, 1995
 The Prešeren Foundation Award, 1999
 Pazin International Publishers' Award, 2000
 Njegoš Award (Montenegrin International Award) nomination, Med drevesi, 2017
 Župančič Award, Med drevesi, 2018

References 

Writers from Ljubljana
Slovenian poets
Slovenian male poets
Slovenian translators
Slovenian editors
Living people
1962 births
University of Ljubljana alumni